Dermot Healy (9 November 1947 – 29 June 2014) was an Irish novelist, playwright, poet and short story writer. A member of Aosdána, Healy was also part of its governing body, the Toscaireacht. Born in Finea, County Westmeath, he lived in County Sligo, and was described variously as a "master", a "Celtic Hemingway" and as "Ireland's finest living novelist".

Often overlooked due to his relatively low public profile, Healy's work is admired by his Irish literary predecessors, peers and successors alike, many of whom idolise him—among the writers to have spoken highly of him are Seamus Heaney, Eugene McCabe, Roddy Doyle, Patrick McCabe and Anne Enright.

He was  longlisted for the Booker Prize with his Novel A Goats Song. Healy won the Hennessy Award (1974 and 1976), the Tom Gallon Award (1983), and the Encore Award (1995).  In 2011, he was shortlisted for the Poetry Now Award for his 2010 poetry collection, A Fool's Errand. Long Time, No See was nominated for the International Dublin Literary Award, the world's most valuable literary award for a single work in the English language, by libraries in Russia and Norway.

Life
Healy was born in Finea, County Westmeath, the son of a Guard. As a child the family moved to Cavan, where Healy attended the local secondary school. In his late teens he moved to London and worked in a succession of jobs, including barman, security man and as a labourer. He later returned to Ireland, settling in Ballyconnell, County Sligo, a small settlement on the Atlantic coast. He died at his home on 29 June 2014, while awaiting an ambulance after suddenly being taken ill. He was laid to rest at Carrigans Cemetery following funeral mass by Fr. Michael Donnelly at St Patrick's Church in Maugherow.

Style
Healy's work is influenced by an eclectic range of writers from around the world, including Anna Akhmatova, John Arden, Isaac Babel, Bashō, Samuel Beckett, Jorge Luis Borges, Angela Carter, J. M. Coetzee, Emily Dickinson, Maria Edgeworth, T. S. Eliot, Hermann Hesse, Nâzım Hikmet, Aidan Higgins, Miroslav Holub, Eugène Ionesco, Franz Kafka, Mary Lavin, Federico García Lorca, Guy de Maupassant, Edgar Allan Poe, Sylvia Plath, Ezra Pound, William Shakespeare and Robert Louis Stevenson. Healy wrote in a shed (though, on being a writer, was quoted as saying: "I know writing is what I do but I still don't see myself as one") and was fascinated by etymology.

List of works

Fiction
 Banished Misfortune (London: Allison & Busby, 1982), collected short stories
 Fighting with Shadows (London: Allison & Busby 1984)
 A Goat's Song (London: Collins Harvill, 1994)
 Sudden Times (London: The Harvill Press, 1999)
 Long Time, No See (Faber and Faber, 2011)
 The Collected Short Stories (Dalkey Archive Press, 2015)

Autobiography
 The Bend for Home (Harvill, 1996)

Plays
Here and There and Going to America (1985)
The Long Swim (1988)
Curtains (1990)
On Broken Wings (1992)
Last Night's Fun (1994)
Boxes (1998)
Mister Staines (1999)
Metagama (2005)
A Night at the Disco (2006)
The Collected Plays (Dalkey Archive Press, 2016)

Poetry
Neighbours' Lights (1992)
The Ballyconnel Colours (1995)
What the Hammer (1998)
The Reed Bed (2001)
A Fool's Errand (The Gallery Press, 2010)

Film
I Could Read the Sky (1999) [as an actor]

References

External links

 Dermot Healy at Aosdána
 Dermot Healy at Irish Writers Online
 The Writing in the Sky
 

1947 births
2014 deaths
Aosdána members
Irish male dramatists and playwrights
Irish male short story writers
People from County Westmeath
20th-century Irish dramatists and playwrights
20th-century Irish novelists
20th-century Irish male writers
Irish male novelists
20th-century Irish poets
Irish male poets
21st-century Irish dramatists and playwrights
21st-century Irish novelists
21st-century Irish poets
20th-century Irish short story writers
21st-century Irish short story writers
21st-century Irish male writers